Melanocortin 3 receptor (MC3R) is a protein that in humans is encoded by the  gene.

Function 
This gene encodes MC3R, a G-protein coupled receptor (GPCR) for melanocyte-stimulating hormone (MSH) and adrenocorticotropic hormone (ACTH) that is expressed in the brain. This gene maps to the same region as the locus for benign neonatal epilepsy. Mice deficient for this gene have increased fat mass, reduced lean mass and decreased food intake, all suggesting a role for the receptor in the regulation of energy homeostasis. MC3R mutations has been linked to reduced growth rate during childhood and a delay in the age of puberty onset.

Research
Studies performed by the Eunice Kennedy Shriver National Institute of Child Health and Human Development (NICHD), found that two specific polymorphisms in the MC3R gene may be associated with pediatric obesity and greater body mass because of greater energy intake. Children who were homozygous for C17A + G241A consumed approximately 38% more than those who did not contain aforementioned polymorphisms. The study concluded that these genetic variants did not affect energy expenditure.

Ligands
 Ac-Val-Gln-(pI)DPhe-DTic-NH2, first MC3 selective agonist, 100x selectivity over MC4.
 Ac-Val-Gln-DBip-DTic-NH2, 140x selectivity over MC4.
 Pyrrolidine bis-cyclic guanidines, non-peptide small molecule MC3 agonists, good selectivity over MC4 but not over MC1 or MC5.
 SHU-9119, mixed MC3/MC4 antagonist.

See also 
 Melanocortin receptor

References

Further reading

External links 
 

G protein-coupled receptors
Human proteins